The Parliament of Morocco is the bicameral legislature located in Rabat, the capital of Morocco.

History
The traditional representative system in Morocco was organized through traditional structures such as the ulema assembly by cities and regions, or the Jemaa assembly within the tribes. These structures were not elected, but nominated through a cooptation system.

From 1880, Morocco began a range of reforms to adapt its institutions to modern standards. Among these reforms the creation of the position of grand vizier, having a structured and durable cabinet, with six ministries, including foreign affairs, finance, defense etc. In the process, the Sultan Abdelaziz decided to create a consultative assembly in 1904, which he named Majlis el Aayane. It is this assembly that summoned the international conference of Algeciras, and that drafted the constitution of 1908, which never entered into force because of the political unrests.

The Majlis el Ayane was dissolved in 1913, as a result of the Treaty of Fes, which established the French Protectorate. But since 1947, on impulse Erik Labonne, Resident General of France in Morocco, and the Sultan Muhammad V, the protectorate creates consultative chambers reserved for Moroccans, Jews and Muslims. These elected chambers, through the elections  of 1947 and 1951, were in reality only a weak response of the protectorate system to the nationalists claims expressed en 1944 manifesto of independence. The Istiqlal who accept to participate in the 1947 elections, earning three elected representatives, eventually boycott the 1951 elections.

At the end of 1955, and after the return from exile of Sultan Mohammed V, November 16, and the victory of nationalists, Morocco adopted in a first step, a non-elected parliament, resulting from consultations with the main political parties to lay the foundations for future elections. The first chamber was chaired by Mehdi Ben Barka. The first Moroccan Constitution adopted in 1963 created a bicameral parliament consisting of the House of Representatives and House of Councillors.

The 1970 Constitution abandon bicameralism and opts for a single room. The 1992 Constitution allows elected to create committees of inquiries.

Under the state of emergency, the Head of State (in this case the King of Morocco) may dissolve Parliament, "the state of exception does not cause the dissolution of parliament" ( Article 35, paragraph 2 of the 1972 constitution revised in 1996). During the years of lead - under the reign of Hassan II - the right was quite improperly invoked, since the first and only state of emergency that gripped the Morocco lasted five years, from June 1965 to July 1970. However, constitutions adopted after that date contained many restrictions of public freedoms, close to the state of emergency. Until 1977, no elected parliament has completed its term.

Composition
Since 1996, the national legislature has become bicameral and has therefore two parliamentary chambers:
 The House of Representatives or the lower house. 395 members elected directly for a five-year term.
 The House of Councillorss 120 members are elected indirectly for a six-year term by two sets of electoral colleges.

The Members of Parliament come from Morocco and the Moroccan-held parts of Western Sahara (under Moroccan law treated as the Southern Provinces).

Reserve power
Part of the reserve powers, the head of State (in this case the King of Morocco) has the right to dissolve the Parliament. In the past, during the "years of lead" under King Hassan II, this right was used extensively, along with suspensions and extensions of terms. Thus, until 1997, not a single elected Parliament was able to complete its term under normal circumstances.

Role
The role of Parliament, and the respect of the monarchy for its integrity, has increased considerably since 1999, when Mohammed VI took the throne. However, the power of Parliament is still being limited as it is the King who appoints the prime minister and on proposition from the latter, the members of government.

Current Government
The current government in Morocco is headed by Aziz Akhannouch in a Coalition Government which include his own party, the National Rally of Independents, the Authenticity and Modernity Party and the Istiqlal Party.

See also
 Politics of Morocco
 Elections in Morocco
 List of political parties in Morocco
 List of legislatures by country

References

External links
 

Politics of Morocco
Morocco
Morocco
Morocco